Cephetola obscura, the obscure epitola, is a butterfly in the family Lycaenidae. It is found in Sierra Leone, Liberia, Ivory Coast, Ghana and western Nigeria. Its habitat consists of forests.

References

Butterflies described in 1933
Poritiinae